Deprodone, also known as desolone, is a synthetic glucocorticoid corticosteroid.

References

Diketones
Diols
Glucocorticoids
Pregnanes
Abandoned drugs